Skyblazer or Sky Blazer may refer to:

Entertainment 
 Sky Blazers (1939), an American radio program featuring youth-oriented dramatizations of the exploits of adventurous aviators, hosted by aviator Roscoe Turner and announcer Nelson Case
 Sky Blazer (1946-1967), a roller coaster at Savin Rock Amusement Park in West Haven, Connecticut, designed by Vernon Keenan
 Sky Blazer (video game) (1983), a horizontally scrolling shooter game for Atari 8-bit, a.k.a. Star Blazer on the Apple II
 Skyblazer (1994), a Japanese platform video game published by Sony Imagesoft, released for the Super Nintendo Entertainment System

Aviation 
 The  (1949-1962), an aerial demonstration team of the United States Air Forces in Europe (USAF)
 F-15D Eagle 957 "Sky Blazer" (Hebrew:), an Israeli aircraft involved in the 1983 Negev mid-air collision
 Phoenix Skyblazer, an American helicopter produced ca. 2013
 Haynes Aero Skyblazer, a flying car concept under development

Other 
 Salazar Tech Skyblazers, the academic sports program of the Salazar Colleges of Science and Institute of Technology (est. 1983), in the Philippines